This is a list of inland islands of Ireland, within lakes and rivers of Ireland.

Lough islands
In Lough Corrib:
White Goat Island
In Lough Derg:
Inis Cealtra
In Lower Lough Erne:
Ardy More
Buck Island
Car Island
Cleenishmeen Island
Coughran's Island
Crevinishaughy Island
Cruninish Island
Derryinch
Devenish Island
Ferny Island
Gall Island
Goat Island
Gravelly Island
Horse Island
Inish Beg
Inish Conra
Inish Davar
Inish Divann
Inish Doney
Inish Fovar
Inish Free
Inish Lougher
Inishmacsaint
Inish More
Inishmakill
Kinnausy Island
Leftus Island
Long Island
Lustybeg Island
Lustymore Island
Owl Island
Paris Island Big
Rabbit Island
Rosscor Island
Rough Island
White Island
In Upper Lough Erne:
Belle Isle
Bleanish Island
Corratistune
Dernish Island
Inishcorkish
Inishleague
Inishlirroo
Inishlught
Inish Rath
Killygowan Island
Naart Island
Shanaghy
Tonregee Island
Traanish
Trasna
In Lough Gill:
Lake Isle of Innisfree
21 others
In Lough Leane:
Innisfallen
and others
In Lough Neagh:
Coney Island
Coney Island Flat
Croaghan Flat
Derrywarragh Island
Padian
Ram's Island
Phil Roe's Flat
The Shallow Flat
In Lough Owel:
Browns or Grania's Island
Church Island
Carrickphilbin Island
Glassford Island
Mount Murray Island
Sruddorra Island
In Lough Ree:
Inchcleraun (Quaker Island)
Hare Island

River islands
In River Shannon:
King's Island in Limerick
Canon Island
In River Lee:
City Centre Island in Cork
Lapp's Island
In River Suir:
Little Island
In River Fergus:
Inishmacowney
Inishloe

See also
 List of islands of Ireland, coastal islands
 List of islands of County Mayo (includes inland islands)
 List of rivers in Ireland
 List of loughs in Ireland

Ireland, List of inland islands of
Islands inland